The Communauté de communes Falaises du Talou (before 2017: Communauté de communes des Monts et Vallées) is a federation of 24 municipalities (a communauté de communes) located in the Seine-Maritime département of the Normandy region of north-western France. It was created on 1 January 2002, consisting of 16 communes. On 1 January 2017 it was expanded with 8 communes, and it was renamed Communauté de communes Falaises du Talou. Its seat is Envermeu. Its area is 328.5 km2, and its population was 23,598 in 2018.

Composition
The communauté de communes consists of the following 24 communes:

Avesnes-en-Val
Bailly-en-Rivière
Bellengreville
Canehan
Cuverville-sur-Yères
Dampierre-Saint-Nicolas
Douvrend
Envermeu
Freulleville
Les Ifs
Meulers
Notre-Dame-d'Aliermont
Petit-Caux
Ricarville-du-Val
Saint-Aubin-le-Cauf
Saint-Jacques-d'Aliermont
Saint-Martin-le-Gaillard
Saint-Nicolas-d'Aliermont
Saint-Ouen-sous-Bailly
Saint-Vaast-d'Équiqueville
Sauchay
Sept-Meules
Touffreville-sur-Eu
Villy-sur-Yères

See also
Communes of the Seine-Maritime department

References 

Falaises du Talou
Falaises du Talou